Independencia is a district of the Lima Province in Peru. It is located in the north area of the city.

History 
In the Viceroyalty and early years of the republic, it was part of the great territory of Carabayllo. 

Until the decade of the 1950s, the strong migration produced from the interior of the country brought waves of families to the capital looking for a better future in the capital.

In the mid of this context, and given the need of these migrant families to acquire their own land, in 1959 the Associations of Parents of Pro-housing Families "Tahuantinsuyo" and "Pampa de Cueva - Independencia" were founded.

On the morning of November 17, 1960, some families, entered the deserts along kilometers 5 and 6 of Túpac Amaru Avenue, the old road to Canta, in a very organized manner.

Faced with the repression, the families withdrew until they reached kilometer four, next to the railway, where they resisted for 37 days in the face of inclement weather, lack of services, medicine and food. It was in this period that the death of some children on the railway tracks occurred. Tribute was paid to this sacrifice by naming one of the main streets of the district after Los Niños Martires.

In the following years, the area of Pampa de Repartición located at kilometer six and a half, in the district of Comas, was urbanized, establishing the Tahuantinsuyo Urbanization; then the land of Pampa El Ermitaño in Rímac District was occupied, located at kilometer four, other extensions of land would later be populated, integrating the human settlements of the peripheries. 

After the complaints of the neighbors, the Congress decided to create a new district.

Officially created district on March 16, 1964. For Law 14965. The new district is segregated from Comas and Rímac Districts. Subsequently, through Law 16012 of January 31, 1966, its limits were deepened.

Borderline conflict 
In 1989 due to the territorial reduction of the district of San Martín de Porres by the creation of the district of Los Olivos, the old industrial area of 2.40 square kilometers, which is delimited by Avenue Panamericana Norte, Avenue Naranjal, Avenue Tupac Amaru and Avenue Tomas Valle, and made up of the Mesa Redonda, El Naranjal, Industrial Panamericana Norte, Industrial El Naranjal and Industrial Mulería urbanizations, became a disputed territory between Independencia and San Martin de Porres.

The position of the district of Independencia is that when the district of Los Olivos is created, part of the old industrial zone should be annexed. On the other hand, San Martin de Porres argues that the law creating Los Olivos does not detail the cession of territory to other districts not involved in addition to not having been an express request of the residents. It also highlights that the law creating Independencia (Law No. 14965​, Law No. 16012​​ ) marks its limit on the Old Panamericana Norte (today Avenida Túpac Amaru).

The conflict also affects the municipal tax system, since large shopping centers are taxed in Independencia, but urbanizations and small and medium-sized businesses are taxed in San Martín de Porres. In 1998, residents of the Naranjal urbanization identified with San Martín de Porres confronted the Mayor of Independencia, Guillermo Chacaltana, and his aldermen in a brawl on Los Alisos avenue. In 2013, a fight occurred between citizens of the area and security guards over border problems. In 2015, residents of San Martín de Porres blocked the Panamericana Norte highway for about 45 minutes to demand that their area not be assigned to the district of Independencia through a bill. In 2017, residents of the area, identified with San Martín de Porres, refused to participate in the 2017 National Census because the National Institute of Statistics and Informatics considered said area as territory of Independence.

In February 2020, a confrontation occurred between the serenazgo de Independencia and the residents of Mesa Redonda due to interventions on motorcycle taxis that served in San Martín de Porres. In December of the same year, a confrontation between neighbors and serenading of both municipalities in the Mercado Naranjal, with the intervention of the police and the prosecutor's office.​ The Naranjal Municipal Agency is located in the area in the El Naranjal urbanization administered by the municipality of San Martín de Porres.

Currently there is no definitive solution by the Metropolitan Planning Institute, Metropolitan Municipality of Lima, or the Congress of the Republic.

Economy 
The district of Independencia is generally enabled by popular families of medium, medium-low and low socioeconomic status.

There are shopping centers and institutions that are located in the area in dispute with San Martín de Porres, these are:

 Plaza Norte (North Plaza Mall), the largest shopping center in the country.
 MegaPlaza Norte
 Royal Plaza

 Metro
 Tottus
 PlazaVea
 SODIMAC

 San Ignacio de Loyola University

 Cibertec
 Certus

 ICPNA - Peruvian North American Cultural Institute

Transport 

 Metropolitano (El Milagro, Tomás Valle, Los Jazmines, Independencia, Pacífico, Izaguirre and Naranjal Station)
 101 Bus (Corredor Amarillo)

Geography
The district has a total land area of 14.56 km².(considering the zone in conflict, area of ​​total control is 12.16 km²)  Its administrative center is located 130 meters above sea level.

Boundaries
 North: Comas
 East: San Juan de Lurigancho
 South: Rímac and San Martín de Porres
 West: Los Olivos

Demographics
According to a 2002 estimate by the INEI, Independencia has 206,843 inhabitants and a population density of 14,206.3 persons/km². In 1999, there were 36,999 households in the district.

Authorities

Mayors 
1967–1969: Victoriano García Delgadillo
1970: Arturo Novoa Torres
1971: Claudio Pinedo Acuña
1971: Amadeo Gonzáles Rumiche
1971–1975: Claudio Pinedo Acuña
1975: Emiliano Moriano Luján
1976–1979: Luis Alvarado Díaz
1979: Fidencio Cueva Roca
1980: Francisco Ruiz Mencía
1980: César Rodríguez Galindo
1981–1983: Leoncio Vigo Loja
1984–1989: Esther Moreno Huerta
1990–1992: Jesús Manuel Cáceres Fanaola
1993–1995: Jenny Jesús Olivera Olivera
1996–1997: Roberto Vidal Vidal
1997–1998: Néstor Pajuelo Chavarría
1998–2002: Guillermo Chacaltana Yerén
2003–2006: Víctor Yuri Vilela Seminario
2007–2010: Lovell Yomond Vargas
2011–2018: Evans Rodolfo Sifuentes Ocaña
2019–2022: Yuri Pando

See also 
 Administrative divisions of Peru
 Cono Norte

References

External links

  Official district's web site
  Historical Graphic

Districts of Lima